This is a list of national swimming records for Costa Rica. These are the fastest times ever swum by a Costa Rican swimmer.

These records are kept by Costa Rica's national swimming federation: Federación Costarricense de Deportes Acuáticos (FECODA).

Long Course (50 m)

Men

Women

Mixed relay

Short Course (25 m)

Men

|-bgcolor=#DDDDDD
|colspan=9|
|-

|-bgcolor=#DDDDDD
|colspan=9|
|-

|-bgcolor=#DDDDDD
|colspan=9|
|-

|-bgcolor=#DDDDDD
|colspan=9|
|-

|-bgcolor=#DDDDDD
|colspan=9|
|-

Women

|-bgcolor=#DDDDDD
|colspan=9|
|-

|-bgcolor=#DDDDDD
|colspan=9|
|-

|-bgcolor=#DDDDDD
|colspan=9|
|-

|-bgcolor=#DDDDDD
|colspan=9|
|-

|-bgcolor=#DDDDDD
|colspan=9|
|-

Mixed relay

References
General
Costa Rican Long Course Records 22 June 2021 updated
Specific

External links
FECODA website

Costa Rica
Records
Swimming
Swimming